The 1976 Women's African Volleyball Championship was the First African continental volleyball Championship for women in Africa and it was held in Port Said, Egypt, with Six teams has participated.

Teams

Final ranking

References

1976 Men
African championship, Women
Women's African Volleyball Championship
1976 in Egyptian sport
International volleyball competitions hosted by Egypt